The popularity of Running Man throughout Asia has also provided the opportunity for the production team to organize fan meeting tours in Asia since 2013.

Tours

2013: Race Start! Running Man Fan Meeting Asia Tour

2014: Race Start! Running Man Fan Meeting Asia Tour Season 2

2015: Race Start! Season 3 – Running Man Special Tour

2017: Race Start! Season 4 – Running Man Fan Meeting

2018: Running Man Live in Taipei

2019: Running Man Live

2021: Running Man 2021 Online Fanmeeting

2023: Running Man: A Decade of Laughter

References

Running Man (TV series)